The following is the final results of the Iran Super League 2003/04 basketball season.

Regular season

Playoffs

 Saba Battery qualified to WABA Champions Cup 2005.

References
 Asia-Basket

Iranian Basketball Super League seasons
League
Iran